The Stewart M-2 was an American all-metal, twin-engined, aerial survey aircraft.

Design and development
The W.F. Stewart Company was a custom builder of wooden auto bodies. When factory-built steel bodies overtook wood construction, the company broke into the aviation market with the Stewart M-1, an all-wood monoplane. Sensing wood construction was about to be overtaken by all-metal aircraft, the Stewart M-2 was developed.

The M-2 was an all-metal, twin-engined aircraft with conventional landing gear, powered with Wright J-6 engines. 225 hp Packard DR-980 engines were later installed and tested. Townend rings were used on the re-installed Wright J-6 engines.

Operational history
Designer Jack Hunt test flew the prototype on 22 May 1931. No orders for new aircraft were received. The aircraft was used by Abrams Aerial Survey Corporation for aerial surveys. The airframe was scrapped in 1941.

Specifications (M-2)

References

1930s United States civil utility aircraft
W.F. Stewart Company aircraft
Aircraft first flown in 1930
Twin-engined tractor aircraft